Czesław Mozil (born April 12, 1979), known under the alias Czesław Śpiewa, is a Polish-Danish singer and musician (mostly using the accordion), and graduate of the Royal Danish Academy of Music.

Life 
Mozil moved to Denmark when he was 5, returning to Poland at the age of 28. He makes hard-to-classify music, with pieces of cabaret, rock, and even punk rock.

He also founded the Danish rock band Tesco Value (name of the group comes from his nickname, which was given to young Czesław Mozil on a vacation in England).

In 2007 he played live with the Polish band Hey during their MTV Unplugged show.

Czesław was a judge on the talent show X-Factor (Poland). He has expressed his support for LGBT rights.

His name was the correct answer to the winning final question on the Milionerzy quiz show in 2010, the Polish version of Who Wants to Be a Millionaire?

Discography

Studio albums

Live albums

Video albums

Music videos

References

External links 

Official Website 
Record Label  

1979 births
Living people
Mozil
Musicians from Zabrze
Mystic Production artists
Royal Danish Academy of Music alumni
Polish songwriters
Polish lyricists
21st-century Polish male singers
21st-century Polish singers